Leonel de los Santos Nunez (born December 14, 1994) is a boxer from the Dominican Republic. He competed at the 2016 Summer Olympics in the men's flyweight event, in which he was eliminated in the round of 32 by Yoel Finol.

He represented the Dominican Republic at the 2020 Summer Olympics.

References

1994 births
Living people
Dominican Republic male boxers
Olympic boxers of the Dominican Republic
Boxers at the 2016 Summer Olympics
Boxers at the 2020 Summer Olympics
Central American and Caribbean Games bronze medalists for the Dominican Republic
Competitors at the 2014 Central American and Caribbean Games
Competitors at the 2018 Central American and Caribbean Games
Boxers at the 2015 Pan American Games
Boxers at the 2019 Pan American Games
Pan American Games silver medalists for the Dominican Republic
Pan American Games medalists in boxing
Flyweight boxers
Central American and Caribbean Games medalists in boxing
Medalists at the 2019 Pan American Games

Sportspeople from Santo Domingo
20th-century Dominican Republic people
21st-century Dominican Republic people